Chaetacanthidius unifasciatus is a species of beetle in the family Cerambycidae, and the only species in the genus Chaetacanthidius. It was described by Gilmour in 1948.

References

Desmiphorini
Beetles described in 1948
Monotypic Cerambycidae genera